Apatelodes palma is a moth in the family Apatelodidae first described by Herbert Druce in 1900. It is found in Costa Rica and Mexico.

References

External links

Apatelodidae
Moths described in 1900